Thorvald Lammers (15 January 1841 – 8 February 1922) was a Norwegian baritone singer, choral conductor, composer, and biographer.

Lammers was born in Modum, and made his stage début in Oslo in 1873. He founded the choir known as Korforeningen in 1879, and conducted it until 1909. By around 1900, Lammers was regarded as Norway's most important male singer. Among his compositions are the songs "Gamle Norig" and "Der ligger et land".

References

1841 births
1922 deaths
People from Modum
Norwegian operatic baritones
Norwegian choral conductors
Male conductors (music)
Norwegian male composers
Norwegian biographers
Norwegian male writers
Male biographers
Burials at the Cemetery of Our Saviour
19th-century Norwegian male singers
Choral composers